is a dam in Yokkaichi, Mie Prefecture, Japan, completed in 1966.

References 

Dams in Mie Prefecture
Dams completed in 1966